Kelly Petersen Pollard (born 30 April 1999) is a British judoka.

Judo career
Petersen Pollard is a three times champion of Great Britain, winning the middleweight division at the British Judo Championships in 2018, 2019 and 2021.

She is the bronze medallist of the 2021 Judo Grand Slam Baku in the -70 kg category. At the 2021 Judo Grand Slam Abu Dhabi held in Abu Dhabi, United Arab Emirates, she won one of the bronze medals in her event.

She won one of the bronze medals in her event at the 2022 Judo Grand Slam Tel Aviv held in Tel Aviv, Israel.

References

External links
 
 
 

1999 births
Living people
British female judoka
Judoka at the 2022 Commonwealth Games